Alice Marion Shaw (born August 22, 1890) was an American composer, pianist, and teacher who was a well-known accompanist during the early 20th century. 

Shaw was one of three children born in Rockland, Maine, to Reverend Eurastus Melville Shaw and the composer Carrie Burpee Shaw. She studied piano with Zygmunt Stojowski and composition with Percy Goetschius at the Institute of Musical Art (today the Juilliard School). She taught at the Rockland Music School, which was started by her mother, before moving to New York.

Shaw was the accompanist for the New York Rubinstein Club in 1915 and for the Maine Festival in 1916. She taught piano in New York and accompanied many noted artists, including flutist George Barrere, violinists Eddy Brown and Scipione Guidi, and singers Louis Graveure, Vernon Stiles, and Eleanor Painter Strong. She often performed the accompaniments from memory. 

Shaw composed nearly 100 songs as well as music for organ, piano, cello, flute and violin. Her music was published by J. Fischer & Brother and Luckhardt & Belder. Songs she composed included:

Songs 

First Day of the Week (mixed chorus)

“Little Man in Gray”

“May Noon” (text by Aldrich)

“Night”

“Once on a Radiant Morning”

“One April Day” (text by W. P. Gilmour) 

“Pussy-Willows” (text by Winnifred Fales)

“Road to China” (text by Mazie V. Caruthers)

“There is a LIttle Lady” (text by W. P. Gilmour)

“To Go and Forget” (text by Edwin Markham)

“To the Unknown”

“Waiting” (text by Charles Hanson Towne)

References

External links
Download free sheet music by Alice Marion Shaw

American women composers
1890 births
20th-century American pianists
Juilliard School alumni
People from Rockland, Maine
Date of death missing
Place of death missing
20th-century American composers
20th-century American women pianists
20th-century women composers
Musicians from Maine